Phellinus pomaceus is a plant pathogen particularly common on Prunus species. It is not aggressively pathogenic but can cause considerable decay in trees suffering from other stress factors.

References

Fungal tree pathogens and diseases
Stone fruit tree diseases
pomaceus
Fungi described in 1933
Taxa named by Christiaan Hendrik Persoon